Manong is a small town in Kuala Kangsar District, Perak, Malaysia. This small town is located along Perak River.

Kuala Kangsar District
Towns in Perak